Adam "A. J." Johnson (born September 3, 1992) is an American professional bowler from Oswego, Illinois. He is a member of the Professional Bowlers Association (PBA) since 2015.

Amateur career

Johnson bowled collegiately for McKendree University, where he earned first-team All-American and MVP honors in the 2013–14 season. In 2013, he was a member of Junior Team USA. He won the 2013 Junior Gold Championships as a youth bowler for the United States. He has been a five-time member of Team USA. In the 2019 PABCON Championships, he won gold in team and all events, and silver in singles. He previously won gold in team and bronze in all events at the 2017 World Bowling Championships.

Johnson was part of the rotating four-person team (with Jakob Butturff, Andrew Anderson and Kristopher Prather) that won the trios gold medal for Team USA at the 2021 International Bowling Federation (IBF) Super World Championships in Dubai. With the final match between USA and South Korea ending in a tie, Johnson was chosen by coach Bryan O'Keefe to roll the tenth frame of a ninth/tenth frame roll-off, which USA won 57–49.

On August 23, 2022, Johnson and partner Kris Prather won gold medals in Doubles at the PanAm Bowling Champion of Champions event held in Rio de Janeiro, Brazil. With an eight-game total of 1,921 pins (240.13 average), Johnson topped the men's field for the event. He and Prather were part of a USA sweep in Doubles, as Shannon O'Keefe and Bryanna Coté won Doubles gold in the women's event. Johnson settled for bronze medals in the Singles and All Events categories, finishing third in both behind teammate Prather and Brazil's Bruno Costa.

Professional career
Johnson is a three-time PBA Midwest Region Player of the Year (2017, 2018 and 2020)., and he won the 2019 KPBA SamHo Cup, a Korean PBA event. He has won ten PBA Regional Tour titles. While he has yet to win a title on the national PBA Tour, he has six runner-up finishes, including finishing second while bowling as an amateur at the 2015 USBC Masters major.

In 2021, Johnson teamed with former NFL star Terrell Owens to win Chris Paul's annual CP3 PBA Celebrity Invitational pro-am event. Johnson qualified as the #3 seed for the 2022 U.S. Open finals, but lost his only match to Jason Belmonte.

Based on points earned during the first 13 events of the 2022 PBA Tour season, Johnson qualified as the #10 seed for the PBA Tour Playoffs. After defeating #7 seed Jakob Butturff in the Round of 16 and #15 seed Shawn Maldonado in the quarterfinals, Johnson was eliminated in the semifinals by sixth-seeded Tommy Jones. Despite no titles, Johnson cashed a career-high $92,700 in 2022.

Johnson is a member of the MOTIV Bowling pro staff.

References

American ten-pin bowling players
Living people
1992 births